Fana Hues is an American Rhythm and blues Singer-songwriter and multi-instrumentalist from Pasadena, California. She appeared on The Guardian 2022 One to watch. Fana rose to stardom in 2021 after being featured on Tyler, the Creator Grammy award-winning album, Call Me If You Get Lost.

Early life 
Fana Hues was born and raised into a musical family in Pasadena. While growing up, she was unable to sing for five years as a child, due to a crippling combination of scarlet fever, tonsillitis, and strep throat. After years of not being able to sing because of her condition, Hues was able to find her voice through years of practice and with the support of her close-knit family.

Career 
Fana Hues started her career singing and performing in her family's band, In 2020 she released her debut single "Notice Me" which she said was inspired by her growing up. Same year, she released her debut album, "Hues". Since then, she has released couple singles, including "Breakfast", which she performed on ColorsxStudios. Her second studio album "fana + flora" was released on 25 March 2022, with the deluxe released the same year.

References

External links 

 Fana Hues at AllMusic

Living people
American rhythm and blues singer-songwriters
People from California
Year of birth missing (living people)